The Charlotte Zolotow Award is an American literary award presented annually for outstanding writing in a picture book published in the United States during the preceding year.  By contrast, the Caldecott Medal is for outstanding illustration in a picture book.  The Zolotow award was established in 1998 by the Cooperative Children's Book Center (CCBC) at the University of Wisconsin–Madison School of Education and named to honor the work of Charlotte Zolotow, an American children's book editor and author.  Ms. Zolotow worked with Harper Junior Books for 38 years during which time she wrote more than 70 picture books. Zolotow attended the University of Wisconsin in Madison on a writing scholarship from 1933 to 36.  The Cooperative Children's Book Center is a children's literature library of the School of Education, University of Wisconsin–Madison.

Eligibility
 Any picture book for young children (birth through age seven) originally written in English, and published the United States between January 1 and December 31 is eligible for consideration.
 The book may be fiction, nonfiction or folklore, as long as it is presented in picture book form and aimed at the birth through seven age range.
 Translated books, poetry collections, and easy readers are not eligible.
 The Committee selects one winner each year.
 It may also designate up to five honor books and up to ten titles to be included on a highly commended list that will call attention to outstanding writing in a picture book.

The winner is announced in January each year. A bronze medallion is formally presented to the winning author in the spring during an annual public event that honors the career of Charlotte Zolotow.

Recipients
{|class="sortable wikitable"
|+ Charlotte Zolotow Award Recipients, Honors, and Highly Commended books 
!Year
!Author
!Title
!Citation
|- style="background:LemonChiffon; color:black"
! rowspan="8" |1998
|
|Lucky Song
|Winner
|- style="background:Lavender; color:black"
|
|Don't Laugh, Joe!
| Honor
|-
|
|If You Were Born a Kitten
|Commended
|-
|
|Country Fair
|Commended
|-
|
|Time to Sleep
|Commended
|-
|
|Ma Dear's Aprons
|Commended
|-
|
|Bearsie Bear and the Surprise Sleepover Party
|Commended
|-
|
|Bunny Cakes
|Commended
|- style="background:LemonChiffon; color:black"
! rowspan="8" |1999
|
|Snow
|Winner
|- style="background:Lavender; color:black"
|
|John Willy and Freddy McGee
|Honor
|- style="background:Lavender; color:black"
|
|Pete's a Pizza
|Honor
|-
|
|Mama Cat Has Three Kittens
|Commended
|-
|
|Circle Dogs
|Commended
|-
| and Susan Kuklin
|Dance
|Commended
|-
|
|Little Clam
|Commended
|-
|
|Elizabeti's Doll
|Commended
|- style="background:LemonChiffon; color:black"
! rowspan="10" |2000
|
|When Sophie Gets Angry -- Really, Really Angry....
|Winner
|- style="background:Lavender; color:black"
|
|Three Cheers for Catherine the Great
|Honor
|- style="background:Lavender; color:black"
|
|Bark, George
|Honor
|-
|
|
|Commended
|-
|
|Little Dog Poems
|Commended
|-
|
|Flicker Flash
|Commended
|-
|
|When Will Sarah Come?
|Commended
|-
|
|How to Catch an Elephant
|Commended
|-
|
|You Are My Perfect Baby
|Commended
|-
|  and David Clemesha
|Trashy Town
|Commended
|- style="background:LemonChiffon; color:black"
! rowspan="8" |2001
|
|
|Winner
|- style="background:Lavender; color:black"
|
|Wings
|Honor
|-
|
|If You Find a Rock
|Commended
|-
|
|Click, Clack, Moo: Cows That Type
|Commended
|-
|
|
|Commended
|-
|
|Yoshi's Feast
|Commended
|-
|
|Shades of Black: A Celebration of Our Children
|Commended
|-
|
|When Winter Comes
|Commended
|- style="background:LemonChiffon; color:black"
! rowspan="7" |2002
|
|Clever Beatrice
|Winner
|- style="background:Lavender; color:black"
|
|Five Creatures
|Honor
|-
|
|Henry's First-Moon Birthday
|Commended
|-
|
|Mabela the Clever
|Commended
|-
|
|Come Back, Hannah!
|Commended
|-
|
|Gugu's House
|Commended
|-
|
|Grump
|Commended
|- style="background:LemonChiffon; color:black"
! rowspan="12" |2003
|
|Farfallina & Marcel
|Winner
|- style="background:Lavender; color:black"
|
|
|Honor
|-
|
|
|Commended
|-
|
|Close Your Eyes
|Commended
|-
|
|Owen's Marshmallow Chick
|Commended
|-
|
|Grandma and Me at the Flea / Los Meros Meros Remateros
|Commended
|-
|  and Jim McMullan
|I Stink!
|Commended
|-
| and Elaine M. Aoki
|
|Commended
|-
|
|All You Need for a Snowman
|Commended
|-
|
|Duck on a Bike
|Commended
|-
|
|Bear Snores On
|Commended
|-
|
|Apple Pie 4th of July
|Commended
|- style="background:LemonChiffon; color:black"
! rowspan="15" |2004
|
|What James Likes Best
|Winner
|- style="background:Lavender; color:black"
|
|Two Old Potatoes and Me
|Honor
|- style="background:Lavender; color:black"
|
|
|Honor
|- style="background:Lavender; color:black"
| and Margaret H. Lippert
|Mrs. Chicken and the Hungry Crocodile
|Honor
|- style="background:Lavender; color:black"
|
|Calabash Cat and His Amazing Journey
|Honor
|- style="background:Lavender; color:black"
|
|Tippy-Toe Chick, Go!
|Honor
|-
|
|Mama's Coming Home
|Commended
|-
| and Madeleine Comora
|George Washington's Teeth
|Commended
|-
|
|Buster
|Commended
|-
|
|Yesterday I Had the Blues
|Commended
|-
| and Robin Page
|What Do You Do With a Tail Like This?
|Commended
|-
|
|Baby Radar
|Commended
|-
|
|Snow Music
|Commended
|-
|
|Mary Smith
|Commended
|-
|
|Don't Let the Pigeon Drive the Bus!
|Commended
|- style="background:LemonChiffon; color:black"
! rowspan="13" |2005
|
|Kitten's First Full Moon
|Winner
|- style="background:Lavender; color:black"
|
|Polar Bear Night
|Honor
|- style="background:Lavender; color:black"
|
|Knuffle Bunny: A Cautionary Tale
|Honor
|- style="background:Lavender; color:black"
|
|Coming On Home Soon
|Honor
|-
|
|Baby Danced the Polka
|Commended
|-
|
|Superdog: The Heart of a Hero
|Commended
|-
|
|BooBoo
|Commended
|-
|
|Always and Forever
|Commended
|-
|
|Hot Day on Abbott Avenue
|Commended
|-
|
|Whose Garden Is It?
|Commended
|-
|
|
|Commended
|-
| and Emily MacLachlan
|Bittle
|Commended
|-
|
|
|Commended
|- style="background:LemonChiffon; color:black"
! rowspan="12" |2006
|
|My Best Friend
|Winner
|- style="background:Lavender; color:black"
| and Onawumi Jean Moss
|Precious and the Boo Hag
|Honor
|- style="background:Lavender; color:black"
|
|Zen Shorts
|Honor
|-
|
|Whatever
|Commended
|-
|
|Snip, Snap! What's That?
|Commended
|-
|
|Oscar's Half Birthday
|Commended
|-
|
|
|Commended
|-
|
|Mutt Dog!
|Commended
|-
|
|Binky
|Commended
|-
|
|No Haircut Today!
|Commended
|-
|
|Cool Cat, Hot Dog
|Commended
|-
|
|Leonardo, the Terrible Monster
|Commended
|- style="background:LemonChiffon; color:black"
! rowspan="12" |2007
|
|Moon Plane
|Winner
|- style="background:Lavender; color:black"
|
|Uncle Peter's Amazing Chinese Wedding
|Honor
|- style="background:Lavender; color:black"
|
|Mrs. Crump's Cat
|Honor
|-
|
|Mystery Bottle
|Commended
|-
|
|Maxwell's Mountain
|Commended
|-
|
|One Green Apple
|Commended
|-
|
|Best Best Friends
|Commended
|-
|
|Little Mamá Forgets
|Commended
|-
|
|Lilly's Big Day
|Commended
|-
|
|
|Commended
|-
|
|Overboard!
|Commended
|-
|
|Gorilla! Gorilla!
|Commended
|- style="background:LemonChiffon; color:black"
! rowspan="14" |2008
|
|Thank You, Bear
|Winner
|- style="background:Lavender; color:black"
|
|At Night
|Honor
|- style="background:Lavender; color:black"
|
|Pictures from Our Vacation
|Honor
|- style="background:Lavender; color:black"
|
|Dragon Dancing
|Honor
|-
|
|Those Shoes
|Commended
|-
|
|Only You
|Commended
|-
|
|
|Commended
|-
|
|
|Commended
|-
|
|
|Commended
|-
|
|What Happens on Wednesdays
|Commended
|-
|
|
|Commended
|-
|
|Pierre in Love
|Commended
|-
|
|Granddad's Fishing Buddy
|Commended
|-
|
|Jazz Baby
|Commended
|- style="background:LemonChiffon; color:black"
! rowspan="14" |2009
|
|How to Heal a Broken Wing
|Winner
|- style="background:Lavender; color:black"
|
|In a Blue Room
|Honor
|- style="background:Lavender; color:black"
|
|
|Honor
|- style="background:Lavender; color:black"
|
| How Mama Brought the Spring
|Honor
|- style="background:Lavender; color:black"
|
|Silent Music: A Story of Baghdad
|Honor
|- style="background:Lavender; color:black"
|
| How I Learned Geography
|Honor
|-
| and Ali Alalou
|
|Commended
|-
|
|
|Commended
|-
|
|
|Commended
|-
|
|Don't Worry Bear
|Commended
|-
|
|Old Bear
|Commended
|-
|
| Hen Hears Gossip
|Commended
|-
|
| Dance with Me
|Commended
|-
|
| Growing Up with Tamales
|Commended
|- style="background:LemonChiffon; color:black"
! rowspan="8" |2010
|
|What Can You Do With a Paleta?
|Winner
|- style="background:Lavender; color:black"
|
|Princess Hyacinth (The Surprising Tale of A Girl Who Floated)
|Honor
|- style="background:Lavender; color:black"
|
|Birds
|Honor
|- style="background:Lavender; color:black"
|
|Pouch!
|Honor
|-
|
|Hello Baby!
|Commended
|-
|
|Ready for Anything
|Commended
|-
|
|Who Will I Be, Lord?
|Commended
|-
|
|Under the Snow
|Commended
|- style="background:LemonChiffon; color:black"
! rowspan="11" |2011
|
|Big Red Lollipop
|Winner
|- style="background:Lavender; color:black"
|
|April and Esme: Tooth Fairies
|Honor
|- style="background:Lavender; color:black"
|
|Hip-Pocket Papa
|Honor
|- style="background:Lavender; color:black"
|
|
|Honor
|- style="background:Lavender; color:black"
|
|City Dog, Country Frog
|Honor
|-
|
|Chavela and the Magic Bubble
|Commended
|-
|
|Willoughby & the Moon
|Commended
|-
|
|My Garden
|Commended
|-
|
|I Am a Backhoe
|Commended
|-
|
|Little Black Crow
|Commended
|-
|
|
|Commended
|- style="background:LemonChiffon; color:black"
! rowspan="14" |2012
|
|Me... Jane
|Winner
|- style="background:Lavender; color:black"
|
|Naamah and the Ark at Night
|Honor
|- style="background:Lavender; color:black"
|
|Meet the Dogs of Bedlam Farm
|Honor
|- style="background:Lavender; color:black"
|
|Apple Pie ABC
|Honor
|-
|
|Samantha on a Roll
|Commended
|-
|
|Fortune Cookies
|Commended
|-
|
|Three By the Sea
|Commended
|-
|
|All the Water in the World
|Commended
|-
|
|These Hands
|Commended
|-
|
|
|Commended
|-
|
|Swirl by Swirl: Spirals in Nature
|Commended
|-
|
|Nothing Like a Puffin
|Commended
|-
|
|Balloons Over Broadway: The True Story of the Puppeteer of Macy's Parade
|Commended
|-
|
|
|Commended
|- style="background:LemonChiffon; color:black"
! rowspan="13" |2013
|
|Each Kindness
|Winner
|- style="background:Lavender; color:black"
|
|Sleep Like a Tiger
|Honor
|- style="background:Lavender; color:black"
|
|Me and Momma and Big John
|Honor
|- style="background:Lavender; color:black"
|
|Flabbersmashed about You
|Honor
|-
|
|Monet Paints a Day
|Commended
|-
|
|We March
|Commended
|-
|
|No Go Sleep!
|Commended
|-
|
|Oh, No!
|Commended
|-
|
|underGROUND
|Commended
|-
|
|Spike, the Mixed-Up Monster
|Commended
|-
|
|Auntie Yang's Great Soybean Picnic
|Commended
|-
|
|Tea Cakes for Tosh
|Commended
|-
|
|Helen's Big World: The Life of Helen Keller
|Commended
|- style="background:LemonChiffon; color:black"
! rowspan="13" |2014
|
|
|Winner
|- style="background:Lavender; color:black"
|
|Building Our House
|Honor
|- style="background:Lavender; color:black"
|
|My Cold Plum Lemon Pie Bluesy Mood
|Honor
|- style="background:Lavender; color:black"
|
|Year of the Jungle
|Honor
|- style="background:Lavender; color:black"
|
|Sophie's Squash
|Honor
|- style="background:Lavender; color:black"
|
|This Is the Rope: A Story from the Great Migration.
|Honor
|-
|
|Big Snow
|Commended
|-
|
|Max and the Tag-Along Moon
|Commended
|-
|
|
|Commended
|-
|
|
|Commended
|-
|
|When No One Is Watching
|Commended
|-
|
|Stripes of All Types
|Commended
|-
|
|My Blue Is Happy
|Commended
|- style="background:LemonChiffon; color:black"
! rowspan="15" |2015
|
|Sparky
|Winner
|- style="background:Lavender; color:black"
|
|Ivan: The Remarkable True Story of the Shopping Mall Gorilla
|Honor
|- style="background:Lavender; color:black"
|
|Tap Tap Boom Boom
|Honor
|- style="background:Lavender; color:black"
|
|Beautiful Moon: A Child's Prayer
|Honor
|- style="background:Lavender; color:black"
|
|Water Rolls, Water Rises = El agua rueda, el agua sube
|Honor
|- style="background:Lavender; color:black"
|
|Chengdu Could Not, Would Not Fall Asleep
|Honor
|- style="background:Lavender; color:black"
|
|One Big Pair of Underwear
|Commended
|-
|
|
|Commended
|-
|
|What Forest Knows
|Commended
|-
|
|Go to Sleep, Little Farm
|Commended
|-
|
|Water Can Be...
|Commended
|-
|
|Beneath the Sun
|Commended
|-
|
|If You Were a Dog
|Commended
|-
|
|Edgar's Second Word
|Commended
|-
|
|Hooray for Hat!
|Commended
|- style="background:LemonChiffon; color:black"
! rowspan="16" |2016
|
|Drum Dream Girl: How One Girl's Courage Changed Music
|Winner
|- style="background:Lavender; color:black"
|
|When Otis Courted Mama
|Honor
|- style="background:Lavender; color:black"
|
|
|Honor
|- style="background:Lavender; color:black"
|
|Last Stop on Market Street
|Honor
|- style="background:Lavender; color:black"
|
|Finding Winnie: The True Story of the World’s Most Famous Bear
|Honor
|- style="background:Lavender; color:black"
|
|Hoot Owl, Master of Disguise
|Honor
|-
|
|When Sophie's Feelings Are Really, Really Hurt
|Commended
|-
|
|Maya's Blanket / La manta de Maya
|Commended
|-
|
|Mama's Nightingale: A Story of Immigration and Separation
|Commended
|-
|
|How the Sun Got to Coco's House
|Commended
|-
|
|Waiting
|Commended
|-
|
|Ragweed's Farm Dog Handbook
|Commended
|-
|
|
|Commended
|-
|
|Water Is Water: A Book about the Water Cycle
|Commended
|-
|
|Miss Hazeltine's Home for Shy and Fearful Cats
|Commended
|-
|
|Goodnight, Good Dog
|Commended
|-style="background:LemonChiffon; color:black"
! rowspan="14" |2017
|
|Freedom in Congo Square
|Winner
|- style="background:Lavender; color:black"
|
|Thunder Boy Jr.
|Honor
|- style="background:Lavender; color:black"
|
|Giant Squid
|Honor
|- style="background:Lavender; color:black"
|Jarvis 
|Alan's Big, Scary Teeth
|Honor
|-
|
|Daniel Finds a Poem
|Commended
|-
|
|Hannah and Sugar
|Commended
|-
|
|
|Commended
|-
| and Theresa Howell
|Maybe Something Beautiful: How Art Transformed a Neighborhood
|Commended
|-
|
|Blocks
|Commended
|-
|
|My New Mom & Me
|Commended
|-
|
|
|Commended
|-
|
|
|Commended
|-
|
|School's First Day of School
|Commended
|-
|
|
|Commended
|- style="background:LemonChiffon; color:black"
! rowspan="14" |2018
|
|
|Winner
|- style="background:Lavender; color:black"
|Atinuke
|Baby Goes to Market
|Honor
|- style="background:Lavender; color:black"
|
|Jabari Jumps
|Honor
|- style="background:Lavender; color:black"
|
|Buster and the Baby
|Honor
|- style="background:Lavender; color:black"
|
|Niko Draws a Feeling
|Honor
|- style="background:Lavender; color:black"
|
|Herbert's First Halloween
|Honor
|-
|
|Before She Was Harriet
|Commended
|-
|
|Big Cat, Little Cat
|Commended
|-
|
|
|Commended
|-
|
|All the Way to Havana
|Commended
|-
|
|When's My Birthday?
|Commended
|-
|
|In the Middle of Fall
|Commended
|-
|
|Little Wolf's First Howling
|Commended
|-
|
|Round
|Commended
|- style="background:LemonChiffon; color:black"
! rowspan="12" |2019
|
|Little Brown
|Winner
|- style="background:Lavender; color:black"
|
|Honey
| Honor
|- style="background:Lavender; color:black"
|
|Saturday Is Swimming Day
|Honor
|-
|
|
|Commended
|-
|
|Carmela Full of Wishes
|Commended
|-
|
|
|Commended
|-
|
|Dreamers
|Commended
|-
|
|
|Commended
|-
|
|
|Commended
|-
|
|Thank You, Omu!
|Commended
|-
|
|We Don't Eat Our Classmates
|Commended
|-
|
|Winter is Here
|Commended
|- style="background:LemonChiffon; color:black"
! rowspan="13" |2020
|
|Johnny's Pheasant
|Winner
|- style="background:Lavender; color:black"
|
|Fry Bread: A Native American Family Story
|Honor
|- style="background:Lavender; color:black"
|
|
|Honor
|- style="background:Lavender; color:black"
|
|Pokko and the Drum
|Honor
|- style="background:Lavender; color:black"
|
|Saturday
|Honor
|- style="background:Lavender; color:black"
|
|Truman
|Honor
|-
|
|Beware of the Crocodile
| Commended
|-
|
|Daniel's Good Day
| Commended
|-
|
|Goodbye, Friend! Hello, Friend!
| Commended
|-
|
|My Papi Has a Motorcycle
| Commended
|-
|
|One Fox: A Counting Book Thriller
| Commended
|-
|
|Small in the City
| Commended
|-
|
|
| Commended
|- style="background:LemonChiffon; color:black"
! rowspan="16" |2021-2022
|
|Evelyn Del Rey Is Moving Away
| Winner
|- style="background:Lavender; color:black"
|
|Catch That Chicken!
| Honor
|- style="background:Lavender; color:black"
|
|
| Honor
|- style="background:Lavender; color:black"
|
|I Talk like a River
|Honor
|- style="background:Lavender; color:black"
|
|My Best Friend
|Honor
|-style="background:Lavender; color:black"
|
|Let Me Fix You a Plate: A Tale of Two Kitchens
|Honor
|-
|
|
|Commended
|-
|
|Eyes That Kiss in the Corners
|Commended
|-
|
|Just like a Mama
|Commended
|-
|
|Kaia and the Bees
|Commended
|-
|
|
|Commended
|-
|
|My Day with the Panye
|Commended
|-
|
|Soul Food Sunday
|Commended
|-
|
|Sun Flower Lion
|Commended
|-
|
|Welcoming Elijah: A Passover Tale with a Tail
|Commended
|-
|
|Where Three Oceans Meet
|Commended
|}

Recipients of Multiple awards, honors, and commendations
Kevin Henkes and Bob Graham are the only two authors to receive all three citations and are the two authors who have received the most citations overall (10 and 8, respectively). No author has yet to receive multiple awards. Jonathan Bean is the only author to receive two citations in one year. In 2014 he received an honor for Building Our House and a commendation Big Snow.

Multiple honors
Three authors have received two Zolotow Honors: Jonathan Bean, James Rumford, Mo Willems, and Jacqueline Woodson.

Multiple commendations
One author has received nine Zolotow commendations.
 Kevin Henkes, 1999, 2003, 2007, 2008, 2009, 2011, 2016, 2018, 2019

Two authors have received four Zolotow commendations.
 Denise Fleming, 1998, 1999, 2004, 2013
 Bob Graham, 2006, 2008, 2014, 2016

Multiple authors have received two Zolotow commendations: Kate Banks, Maribeth Boelts, Monica Brown, Elisha Cooper, Robin Cruise, Greg Foley, George Ella Lyon, Patricia C. McKissack, Mary Lyn Ray, Joyce Sidman, Melissa Stewart, Mo Willems, and Janet S. Wong.

References

American children's literary awards
Awards established in 1998
1998 establishments in Wisconsin
Picture book awards
Wisconsin education-related lists
University of Wisconsin–Madison